Britain Covey (born March 18, 1997) is an American football wide receiver and return specialist for the Philadelphia Eagles of the National Football League (NFL).

Early life and education
Covey grew up in Provo, Utah, and attended Timpview High School. He is the grandson of author Stephen Covey.
In high school, Covey played two years at quarterback and led his team to a 26–0 record. He totaled 4492 passing yards and threw for 56 touchdowns, while also making 2904 rushing yards and scoring 44 touchdowns as a runner. He finished his high school career fourth all-time in Utah touchdowns (with 111), despite only playing two years as a starter. He was twice the Utah Valley Football Player of the Year and led Timpview to back-to-back state championships. Covey made nearly 7,400 yards of total offense at the school.

College career

Covey committed to the University of Utah, and as a true freshman started eight games and appeared in twelve. He led Utah with 43 catches for 519 yards with four touchdown catches, and was the conference leader in receiving yards per game, total receiving yards, catches per game, touchdown catches and overall receptions, being named honorable mention All-Pac-12. He also played on special teams, leading the team with 916 all-purpose yards and being named first-team Freshman All-American by Sporting News and Scout.com for his work as a punt returner. Covey was named a freshman All-America receiver by Pro Football Focus.

Covey missed the 2016 and 2017 seasons as he was on a LDS mission in Chile. He returned to Utah in 2018. That year, he started four games and appeared in a total of thirteen, being named a first-team all-conference returner after posting 221 punt return and 144 kick return yards. He also led Utah in receptions with 60, receiving yards with 637 and yards per game with 49.0. He finished the year with one touchdown and 1,174 all-purpose yards, and also was 3-for-3 passing with 71 yards and two scores. A torn ACL in the Pac-12 Championship Game forced him to miss the bowl games.

In 2019, Covey redshirted after playing in four games (three as a starter). He recorded ten catches for 77 yards, three rush attempts for 22 yards, nine punt returns for 69 yards and three kickoff returns for 52 yards. He was a Pac-12 All-Academic Honor Roll selection.

In a COVID-19-shortened 2020 season, Covey appeared in four games and started two. He made 19 receptions for a team-leading 264 yards and scored a team-high three touchdowns receiving. He was second in the FBS (first in the conference) with a punt return average of 16.1 yards. Against Washington State, Covey recorded 134 receiving yards, a career-high, and made a 91-yard touchdown catch, the second longest in school history. He was a first-team All-Pac-12 return specialist and was honorable mention all-conference at receiver. Phil Steele named him an honorable mention All-American.

As a senior in 2021, Covey started six games and appeared in a total of fourteen, making 52 catches for 514 yards and a team-leading 1,400 all-purpose yards. In the Rose Bowl Game against Ohio State, Covey made a 97-yard kickoff return touchdown and recorded 208 total all-purpose yards, second all-time in a single game for Utah. His kick return score was the fourth longest in team history. He was named Paul Hornung Player of the Week for his performance against San Diego State, in which he made eight catches for 46 yards and a touchdown, in addition to six punt returns for 132 yards and a 25-yard kick return for a total of 203 all-purpose yards. The 132 punt return yards ranked second-most for an FBS player on the season and is sixth all-time in team history for a single game. Covey placed seventh in the FBS with combined return yards with 787 and was third in punt return average and first in punt return touchdowns. He averaged 100.0 yards exactly per game, and was named a CBS Sports and Phil Steele first-team All-American at the end of the year. FWWA named him a second-team selection, as Covey also made first-team All-Pac-12.

Covey finished his college career with the all-time team record in punt return yards (with 1,092), second in career punt returns (with 92), second in catches (with 184), third in all-purpose yards (with 4,241) and sixth in receiving yards (with 2,011). He led the school in receiving yards in three seasons (2015, 2018, 2020) and played in 47 total games, with 23 starts.

Professional career

After going unselected in the 2022 NFL Draft, Covey was signed by the Philadelphia Eagles as an undrafted free agent. He was waived on August 30, 2022 and signed to the practice squad the next day. He was elevated to the active roster for their week one game against the Detroit Lions, and made his NFL debut in the match, returning two punts for 13 yards. Covey was signed to the active roster on October 1. In week thirteen against the Tennessee Titans, he returned six punts for 105 yards for an average of 17.5 yards-per-return, which was the second-highest single-game total in the season. Covey helped the Eagles reach Super Bowl LVII. In the Super Bowl, Covey had 2 punt returns for 35 yards in the Eagles 38-35 loss to the Kansas City Chiefs.

References

External links
 Philadelphia Eagles bio
 Utah Utes bio

Living people
Players of American football from Utah
Sportspeople from Provo, Utah
American football quarterbacks
American football wide receivers
American football return specialists
Utah Utes football players
Philadelphia Eagles players
1997 births